Imolamine (INN, BAN; brand names Angolon, Angoril, Circuline, Irri-Cor, Irrigor, Coremax) is a coronary vasodilator which is used in the treatment of angina pectoris and as a local anesthetic.

Use patents:

Synthesis
Butalamine has very similar synthesis but is alkylated on the alternate nitrogen position.

The reaction of benzoylchloride oxime [698-16-8] (2) with Cyanamide (3) gives 3-Phenyl-1,2,4-oxadiazol-5-amine [3663-37-4] (4). Alkylation with 2-chlorotriethylamine [100-35-6] (5) in the presence of KOH base occurs at the endocyclic ring nitrogen completing the synthesis of imolamine (6).

EFforts towards Onepot method (section 2.5 & 2.6).

References

Local anesthetics
Oxadiazoles
Vasodilators
Diethylamino compounds